Type 99 may refer to:

 Type 99 tank 
 Type 99 (camouflage)
 Type 99 cannon
 Type 99 grenade
 Type 99 light machine gun
 Type 99 rifle
 Type 99 mine
 Type 99 88 mm AA Gun
 Type 99 155 mm self-propelled howitzer
 Kawasaki Army Type 99 Twin-Engine Light Bomber
 Mitsubishi Army Type 99 Light Bomber
 Type 99 air-to-air missile, also has a designation for AAM-4